Kerens is a city in Navarro County, Texas, United States. The population was 1,573 at the 2010 census.

History
Kerens was established in 1881 when the St. Louis Southwestern Railway of Texas was built through the county, according to the Texas Handbook of History, and was named for Judge R. C. Kerens of St. Louis. The railroad bypassed the nearby settlement of Wadeville, and within a short time all of the businesses from Wadeville moved to the new town. By the mid-1890s, the handbook said, the town had three cotton gin-mills, four grocery stores, two hotels, two drug stores, a wagonmaker, and a weekly newspaper named the Navarro Blade.

Big Tex, the giant icon of the State Fair of Texas, had his beginnings in Kerens. In 1949, residents built a  Santa Claus constructed from iron drill casing and papier mache to help encourage holiday sales. In 1951, State Fair president R. L. Thornton purchased Santa's components for $750 and had Dallas artist Jack Bridges transform them into a cowboy for the annual fair.

Geography

Kerens is located at  (32.130639, –96.229207).

Demographics

2020 census

As of the 2020 United States census, there were 1,505 people, 631 households, and 434 families residing in the city.

2000 census
As of the census of 2000, there were 1,681 people, 682 households, and 448 families residing in the city. The population density was 720.4 people per square mile (278.6/km2). There were 750 housing units at an average density of 321.4 per square mile (124.3/km2). The racial makeup of the city was 70.14% White, 22.13% African American, 0.48% Native American, 0.06% Asian, 5.77% from other races, and 1.43% from two or more races. Hispanic or Latino of any race were 7.61% of the population.

There were 682 households, out of which 33.0% had children under the age of 18 living with them, 48.8% were married couples living together, 13.5% had a female householder with no husband present, and 34.2% were non-families. 31.8% of all households were made up of individuals, and 20.7% had someone living alone who was 65 years of age or older. The average household size was 2.46 and the average family size was 3.13.

In the city, the population was spread out, with 28.1% under the age of 18, 7.6% from 18 to 24, 26.5% from 25 to 44, 19.7% from 45 to 64, and 18.1% who were 65 years of age or older. The median age was 36 years. For every 100 females, there were 83.5 males.

The median income for a household in the city was $27,969, and the median income for a family was $36,719. Males had a median income of $26,683 versus $21,600 for females. The per capita income for the city was $13,000. About 13.3% of families and 19.5% of the population were below the poverty line, including 23.8% of those under age 18 and 18.9% of those age 65 or over.

Education
The City of Kerens is served by the Kerens Independent School District.

Climate
The climate in this area is characterized by hot, humid summers and generally mild to cool winters.  According to the Köppen Climate Classification system, Kerens has a humid subtropical climate, abbreviated "Cfa" on climate maps.

Notable people

Tom Mechler, state Republican chairman, formerly lived in Kerens where he was engaged in the oil and gas business

References

External links

 
 City of Kerens – official site
 City-Data.com
 Kerens Independent School District

Cities in Texas
Cities in Navarro County, Texas
Populated places established in 1881
1881 establishments in Texas